Charles Nosike Rugg (born October 2, 1990) is an American soccer player.

Career

Professional
Los Angeles Galaxy selected Rugg in the first round (No. 19 overall) of the 2013 MLS SuperDraft.  Rugg made his debut for Galaxy on April 27, 2013 against Real Salt Lake and also scored his first professional goal in the 13th minute.

On March 22, 2014 Rugg was sent down to the LA Galaxy II, the reserve side of the Galaxy, and played in the sides first USL Pro match against the Orange County Blues. He started the match and scored the first goal in Galaxy II history in the 40th minute.

Rugg was loaned to Indy Eleven for the rest of the NASL season on October 1, 2014. He made his debut on October 4, 2014 against the New York Cosmos and scored his first goal against San Antonio Scorpions on October 18, 2014. His game-winning goal against San Antonio earned him Play of the Week honors. Over the course of his loan, he started and played 90 minutes in all five games he was available for, with the team getting three wins and two draws in those matches.

On March 18, 2015, Rugg rejoined Indy Eleven on a season-long loan.

Rugg's MLS contract was not renewed by the LA Galaxy following the 2015 season

He signed with Eintracht Trier 05 in February 2016 and scored twice in his debut against FC Homburg.

References

External links
 
 

1990 births
Living people
American soccer players
Boston College Eagles men's soccer players
GPS Portland Phoenix players
Worcester Hydra players
LA Galaxy players
LA Galaxy II players
Indy Eleven players
Soccer players from Boston
LA Galaxy draft picks
USL League Two players
Major League Soccer players
USL Championship players
North American Soccer League players
American expatriate soccer players in Germany
Regionalliga players
Association football forwards
FK Pirmasens players
People from Roslindale
American expatriate soccer players